The men's discus throw event at the 1986 World Junior Championships in Athletics was held in Athens, Greece, at Olympic Stadium on 16 and 17 July.  A 2 kg (senior implement) discus was used.

Medalists

Results

Final
17 July

Qualifications
16 Jul

Group A

Group B

Participation
According to an unofficial count, 35 athletes from 26 countries participated in the event.

References

Discus throw
Discus throw at the World Athletics U20 Championships